Ma. Acy Ramos (also credited as Ma. Acy Q. Ramos) is a Filipino television writer.

Filmography

Television 
 2007 Kung Mahawi Man Ang Ulap (brainstormer)
 2008 Sine Novela (brainstormer)
 2009 Dapat Ka Bang Mahalin? (brainstormer)
 2011 I Heart You, Pare! (brainstormer)
 2013 Dormitoryo (Original concept, brainstormer)
 2013 With a Smile (creator, junior head writer (episodes 1–7), head writer (episodes 8-65))
 2015 Love Hotline (episode writer)
 2016–2017 Trops (writer)

External links
 

Filipino dramatists and playwrights
Living people
Filipino screenwriters
GMA Network (company) people
Year of birth missing (living people)